

Israel (from territorial waters)
All of the offshore stations broadcasting to Israel were operating from within Israeli territorial waters under a strange arrangement that attempted to prevent intrusion by terrorists on the one hand, while turning a blind eye to the illegality of the offshore broadcasting operations taking place on board the anchored ships.

1973
Voice of Peace in Hebrew, Arabic and English aboard the MV Peace - created with the aim of promoting peace in the Middle East. The station was generally tolerated by the Israeli Government and it was intentionally sunk in international waters on November 28, 1993, following the signing of the Oslo Peace Accords which it was thought was validation of its mission.

1981
TV Odelia transmitting from the ship MV Odelia - anchored off the coast of Tel Aviv.

1988
Arutz Sheva in Hebrew, English and other languages from the MV Hatzvi at anchorage off the coast of Tel Aviv.

1991
Radio One broadcasting from the MV Air anchored off Haifa. The station was eventually given a license in 1995 to broadcast from within Israel.

1993
Radio Hof aboard the MV Hof.

1995
Radio Dan aboard the MV Kajun, anchored off the coast of Tel Aviv.

References

Israel (land based)
A number of pirate radio stations operated within Israel on the FM band in the mid 1990s. These included:

In Tel Aviv area
 Radio Active
 Radio Center
 Radio Gal
 Radio Kol Ha'ir

Other regions
 Radio Briza, in Haifa area
 Radio Ramat Gan, Ramat Gan
 Kol Ha Mizrah, Northern Israel and Jerusalem.

Middle East